Medin Zhega (31 January 1946 – 12 June 2012) was an Albanian professional football manager and player, who played as a forward.

Playing career

Club
Firstly he played for Vllaznia the football team of Shkodra, then he went to Dinamo Tirana and he concluded his career at the team of Vllaznia. During his career he won several championships in Albania. Medin Zhega quit playing at the age of 32 on 9 September 1979.

International
He made his debut for Albania at age 19 years and 3 months in a May 1965 FIFA World Cup qualification match away against Switzerland and earned a total of 11 caps, scoring 3 goals. His final international was a June 1971 European Championship qualification match against West Germany.

Managerial career
Following his playing career, Zhega became a manager and led the Albania during the 1999–2001 period. He won with Albania 
2000 Rothmans International Tournament. Zhega became a coach, starting his career with his former club of Vllaznia. Later Albanet Tirana in Albania, Prishtina in Kosovo and Shkëndija in Macedonia. He also coached an amateur club in Germany named SV Bad Tölz 1925.

He got the honor award "Master of Work" given by the president of Albania.

Personal life
He was born in Shkodra, Albania 31 January 1946. In May 2011, Zhega had an accident in Toronto, Canada, which made him paraplegic and he remained in a coma for a year until he died 12 June 2012 in Tirana.

He was survived by 2 sons. One of them, Kreshnik, has also played football for Besëlidhja and Teuta and was named assistant to coach Peter Pacult at FK Kukësi in 2018.

Honours

Player
Vllaznia Shkodër
 Albanian Superliga: 1971–72, 1973–74, 1977–78
 Albanian Cup: 1972, 1979
Dinamo Tirana
 Albanian Superliga: 1966–67
 Albanian Cup: 1965

Manager
Vllaznia Shkodër
 Albanian Cup:1981
Albania
 2000 Rothmans International Tournament: 2000

Individual
 Albanian Superliga top scorer: 1966–67 (19 goals)
 Albanian Footballer of the Year 1967

References

External links

1946 births
2012 deaths
Footballers from Shkodër
Albanian footballers
Association football forwards
Albania international footballers
KF Vllaznia Shkodër players
FK Dinamo Tirana players
Albanian football managers
KF Vllaznia Shkodër managers
Albania national football team managers
FC Prishtina managers
FK Shkëndija managers
Besëlidhja Lezhë managers
Kategoria Superiore players
Kategoria Superiore managers
Albanian expatriate football managers
Expatriate football managers in North Macedonia
Albanian expatriate sportspeople in North Macedonia
Expatriate football managers in Kosovo
Albanian expatriate sportspeople in Kosovo